Bao Guo'an (born 4 June 1946) is a Chinese actor and professor in the Central Academy of Drama. Best known for his role as Cao Cao in the 1994 television series Romance of the Three Kingdoms, Bao won two Best Actor awards at the 1995 Golden Eagle Awards and Flying Apsaras Awards. Bao was also a delegate in the National People's Congress and Chinese People's Political Consultative Conference in 2003.

Early life and career
Bao has been fascinated with acting and drama since he was a child. He attended a primary school in Tianjin where most of his schoolmates were from affluent backgrounds while he was not from a wealthy family. On weekends, his schoolmates watched movies at the cinemas. Bao did not join them initially but he did so later when he felt left out, and became addicted to movies. At the time, Tianjin's cinemas were divided into three classes (A, B and C), with A screening the latest movies but having the priciest tickets. Bao could only afford to watch movies in the B and C class theatres, but he saved the allowance his parents gave him for buying snacks, and spent it at the cinema every weekend. Bao recalled watching many Soviet films at that time, including Chapaev and Lenin in 1918, and he especially enjoyed movies about heroes.

In 1960, at the age of 13, Bao gained an opportunity to appear on screen. Around the time, a performing arts group in Tianjin was making a film about a young revolutionary martyr, Liu Wenxue (刘文学), and Bao was chosen as an actor. In 1964, when the Fourth Agricultural Division of the Xinjiang Production and Construction Corps (XPCC) came to Tianjin to recruit cadres, Bao insisted that they let him join their performing arts group. Bao recalled his experience in the XPCC: "Even though I spent only five years in the Fourth Agricultural Division, I learnt a lot of things. Without this experience, I would not have been able to enter the Central Academy of Drama. Life in the military helped me develop the qualities of diligence, perseverance and courage. They have a great impact on shaping my character and personal beliefs, and on my acting career." Five years later, in 1969, Bao was transferred to another group in Zhumadian, Henan, where he worked as an actor and director.

The Mountain Below is Home
In 1978, Bao was accepted into the Central Academy of Drama and, due to excellent performance, was asked to remain and teach there after his graduation. Around the time, the Pearl River Film Company (珠江电影制片公司) was holding auditions in Beijing for the film The Mountain Below is Home (山下是故乡). By chance, Bao was acting in a stage play in Beijing when he was noticed by the director Liu Hongming (刘洪铭) and was selected to play the lead character "Chang Mao". Although Bao has been watching movies since childhood, he had no clue to the process behind acting in a film. He requested to be given a chance to personally experience rural life so that he can prepare better for his role. A month before shooting began, the producers sent Bao to the countryside in You County, Hunan, where he lived among villagers and did menial labour. Bao recalled that when he returned home after working on the film for more than half a year, his appearance had changed so much that his son could not recognise him.

The Opium War
In 1997, Bao was cast as Lin Zexu in Xie Jin's historical epic film The Opium War, which won the 1997 Golden Rooster and the 1998 Hundred Flowers awards for Best Picture. To prepare for the role, Bao travelled to Lin Zexu's hometown of Fuzhou to experience life there. Apart from that, every morning when he woke up, he would imagine himself as Lin Zexu and try to adjust his thoughts and personality to fit his character's.

Zhen Xin
In 2001, Bao played the lead role in Zhen Xin (真心; True Heart), a biographical film about Wu Dengyun (吴登云; b. 1939), a medical doctor known for helping to improve healthcare in Ulugqat County, Xinjiang. Bao commented, "If Lin Zexu was an example of a firm and assertive hero, then Wu Dengyun is a kind and tender hero." Zhen Xin was shot in the Pamir Mountains at an altitude of 5,000m. Bao suffered from severe high blood pressure and during the descent he had to be carried, wearing an oxygen mask and on IV drip. Recalling this incident, he said, "I almost lost my life in making this movie." As Bao was very absorbed into his role, he would feel like crying each time he sees Wu Dengyun, with whom he has developed a close friendship, and when he is reminded of Wu's daughter. He said, "After Wu Dengyun's daughter died, her body was transferred to the morgue in the hospital where Wu Dengyun worked. Every night, he would light a lamp and go to the morgue to see his daughter. This is the "tender" side of the hero Wu Dengyun! Until today it still moves me deeply."

Romance of the Three Kingdoms
Although Bao has portrayed heroes and protagonists many times on screen, his best known role to date, however, is that of an antagonist — "Cao Cao" in Romance of the Three Kingdoms, a 1994 television series based on the classical novel of the same title. Before shooting started, Bao told the producers that he wanted his portrayal of the character to be "answerable to his family and audiences". He was very focused and diligent in preparing for his role, doing extensive research and spending long periods of time pondering over his character. Bao decided not to limit himself to the traditional image of Cao Cao as a villain, so he based his Cao Cao on his personal interpretation of the character in the novel and the Cao Cao described in historical texts. Bao's performance in Romance of the Three Kingdoms propelled him to fame and earned him two Best Actor awards at the 1995 Golden Eagle Awards and Flying Apsaras Awards. After Romance of the Three Kingdoms, Bao promised himself never to act in historical-themed productions again, but ironically, he found himself receiving and accepting more offers to play historical figures in films and television. He commented on this, "Cao Cao got me overwhelmed!".

Initiating Prosperity
In 2005, Bao played the tyrannical Emperor Yang of the Sui dynasty in the television series Initiating Prosperity (开创盛世; The Opening of an Age of Prosperity). He wanted to reject the offer for the role but found it hard because the director and producers were his old friends. In one scene, the emperor is shown shedding tears when sending off his daughter to a distant land to marry a Tujue leader. Bao recalled that he had never been so emotional in any of his previous projects except for Zhen Xin. Bao commented, "He was an emperor but he was also a person! No matter how bad he was, he was still flesh and blood." Bao later revealed that he had imagined Emperor Yang's daughter as his young granddaughter, so he could not hold back his tears at the thought of his granddaughter leaving him. Bao also explained that he wanted to present a complete, three-dimensional, vivid, and historically accurate portrayal of Emperor Yang, which boils down to his flamboyant costumes, as the emperor was known for his extravagance.

Current work
Apart from teaching at the Central Academy of Drama as a professor, Bao continues to remain active in the entertainment industry although he hardly plays leading roles now. Bao mentioned that as he grew older he felt that he has become more mature in his career. He once said that an actor should take precautions not to "slip" as age catches up with him, because if he "slips" he would lose his "explosive power" in acting.

Filmography

Film

TV dramas

References

Citations

Sources 

  Bao Guo'an: Performing artist. This page includes a transcript of an interview with Bao.

External links
 
 
  Bao Guo'an's profile on Haihua Sun's official website
 

Living people
1946 births
People's Republic of China politicians from Tianjin
Yaohua High School alumni
Central Academy of Drama alumni
Academic staff of the Central Academy of Drama
Chinese male film actors
Chinese male television actors
Members of the 9th Chinese People's Political Consultative Conference
Members of the 10th Chinese People's Political Consultative Conference
20th-century Chinese male actors
21st-century Chinese male actors
Male actors from Tianjin